is a single released by zetima on September 25, 2013, to promote the Kumamoto Prefecture mascot Kumamon and celebrate his third birthday. The single was released in two formats: CD only and CD + DVD.

Background 
Written by Kundō Koyama and Kan, "Kumamonmon" features vocals by Chisato Moritaka. Both Koyama and Moritaka are from Kumamoto Prefecture while Kan is from neighboring Fukuoka Prefecture.

The music video was filmed at Kumamoto Castle, featuring dance choreography by Sasuga Minami.

Chart performance 
"Kumamonmon" peaked at No. 13 on Oricon's singles chart.

Track listing

Personnel 
 Chisato Moritaka – vocals (1)
 Motohiro Hata – acoustic guitar (1)
 Kumamon-tai (2)
 Umi Motoiwa – lead vocals
 Megumi Murakami – backing vocals
 Pico – backing vocals

Chart positions

References

External links 
 
 

2013 singles
2013 songs
Japanese-language songs
Japanese children's songs
Chisato Moritaka songs
Zetima Records singles